Chiara Calligaris (born 8 November 1971) is an Italian sailor. She competed in the Yngling event at the 2008 Summer Olympics.

References

External links
 

1971 births
Living people
Italian female sailors (sport)
Olympic sailors of Italy
Sailors at the 2008 Summer Olympics – Yngling
People from Gorizia
Sportspeople from Friuli-Venezia Giulia